Petr Málek (26 November 1961 – 30 November 2019)  was a Czech sport shooter, born in Moravský Krumlov. He won the Silver Medal in skeet at the Sydney 2000 Olympic Games. He was Cyprus coach 2002–2008 and later a private coach. He died in Kuwait, aged 58.

Olympic results

References

1961 births
2019 deaths
People from Moravský Krumlov
Czech male sport shooters
Skeet shooters
Olympic shooters of Czechoslovakia
Olympic shooters of the Czech Republic
Shooters at the 1988 Summer Olympics
Shooters at the 2000 Summer Olympics
Olympic silver medalists for the Czech Republic
Olympic medalists in shooting
Medalists at the 2000 Summer Olympics
Sportspeople from the South Moravian Region